Scopula serena is a moth of the  family Geometridae. It is found in Africa south of the Sahara, from Sierra Leone to Tanzania and to South Africa, as well as on the Indian Ocean islands

The wingspan is 14–17 mm.

References

serena
Moths described in 1920
Moths of Madagascar
Moths of Sub-Saharan Africa
Lepidoptera of West Africa
Lepidoptera of Uganda
Lepidoptera of Angola
Lepidoptera of Malawi
Insects of Seychelles
Lepidoptera of Tanzania
Moths of Réunion